Khalil Shahr (also Romanized as Khalīl Shahr; formerly, Khalil Mahalleh (Persian: خليل محله), also Romanized as Khalīl Maḩalleh and Khallī Mahalleh) is a city in the Central District of Behshahr County, Mazandaran Province, Iran.  At the 2006 census, its population was 10,096, in 2,485 families.

References

Populated places in Behshahr County

Cities in Mazandaran Province